Jesse Patrick Ferguson is a Canadian folk musician and poet. He was born in Cornwall, Ontario and has lived in Ottawa, Ontario, Fredericton, New Brunswick, and Sydney, Nova Scotia. He has produced 5 studio albums of folk music, most recently Folk Favourites (2017). He performs music publicly in Ontario, Canada, and maintains a folk-music YouTube channel under the name The Bard of Cornwall.

His poems and reviews have been published in twelve countries, in both print and online formats, such as in Canadian Literature, The New Quarterly, Prairie Fire, Grain, Poetry Ireland Review, Poetry  and Harper’s. 
His work has also been selected for inclusion in the anthology Best Canadian Poetry in English 2009, edited by A.F. Moritz. He has been a poetry editor for The Fiddlehead, and he plays several musical instruments. In fall 2009, Freehand Books published his first full-length poetry collection, Harmonics. His second full-length book, consisting entirely of visual (concrete) poetry is Dirty Semiotics  
(Broken Jaw Press, 2011). His most recent book is Mr. Sapiens (Wolsak and Wynn, 2014).

References 

Living people
People from Cornwall, Ontario
Writers from Fredericton
Writers from Ontario
Canadian male poets
21st-century Canadian male writers
21st-century Canadian poets
Year of birth missing (living people)